Pierre-Hugues Herbert was the defending champion but lost in the second round to Illya Marchenko.

Norbert Gombos won the title after defeating Julien Benneteau 6–3, 5–7, 6–2 in the final.

Seeds

Draw

Finals

Top half

Bottom half

References
Main Draw
Qualifying Draw

Open d'Orléans - Singles
2017 Singles